Arthur Hindle is a Canadian actor and director.

Early life and education
Hindle was born in Halifax. For 12 years, he alternated living with his divorced parents in addition to living in foster homes. He grew up in Bowmanville, and later at The Beaches area of Toronto, attending Riverdale Collegiate and Malvern Collegiate.

Career
Before he became an actor, Hindle modeled clothes in catalogs for Canadian companies Simpsons-Sears and Eaton's. He also was a stockbroker.

Hindle has made guest appearances in a long list of television programs in North America, and has also appeared in several movies, dating from 1971.

His first major role was in a biker movie, The Proud Rider, spawned by the popularity of Easy Rider. Hindle worked with a real motorcycle gang, Satan's Choice of Oshawa. It was during the production of this film that he almost changed his professional name to Jeremy Kane, as producers thought that Hindle should have a more showbiz-sounding name. 

In 1971, he was cast as Billy Duke in the film Face-Off. This film led to offers from Hollywood which he resisted until work dried up and Hindle, who had four children by this time, finally moved to Los Angeles in 1974.

He had a supporting role in the Canadian horror film Black Christmas in 1974. He had a pivotal supporting role in the 1978 remake of Invasion of the Body Snatchers. He then went onto playing the lead in The Brood and appeared in the 1981 teen sex comedy film Porky's. He later played the role of Harry Dobbs in the popular Canadian TV series, North of 60.

From the early 1990s, Art has also worked as a director. He starred in, and directed, the award-winning series Paradise Falls showing on cable stations in the USA and on the Showcase channel in Canada.

Awards
Hindle has won a Gemini award.

Personal
Hindle is married and divides his time between California and Canada.

Filmography

Films
 1971 The Proud Rider
 1971 Foxy Lady as Football Star
 1971 Face-Off as Billy Duke
 1974 Black Christmas as Chris Hayden
 1976 A Small Town in Texas as "Boogie"
 1978 Invasion of the Body Snatchers as Dr. Geoffrey Howell
 1979 The Brood as Frank Carveth
 1980 The Octagon as A.J.
 1981 Porky's as Ted Jarvis
 1982 Desperate Lives as Stan 
 1983 Porky's II: The Next Day as Ted Jarvis
 1983 The Man Who Wasn't There as Ted Durand
 1983 The Wild Pony as Frank Chase
 1984 The Surrogate as Frank Waite
 1984 Raw Courage as Roger Bower
 1986 Say Yes as Luke
 1987 From the Hip as Lieutenant Matt Sosha
 1987 The Gunfighters (TV Movie) as Cole Everett
 1988 Dixie Lanes as Sheriff Lewis Clark
 1988 Into the Fire as Dirk Winfield
 1989 Piramiddo no kanata ni: White Lion densetsu
 1989 Speed Zone as "Flash"
 1990 The World's Oldest Living Bridesmaid as Brian
 1993 Liar, Liar (TV Movie) as Gilbert Jonathan "Gil" Farrow
 1998 Ice (TV Movie) as US President
 1998 Sleeping Dogs Lie as Ambrose Small
 2000 Submerged as Sam
 2001 Kept as Lance
2001 Stranded as Owen Marsh
 2002 The Trip as Ted Oakley
 2006 One Way as Russel Birk
 2007 Lies and Crimes (TV Movie) as Captain Vic Bochner
 2007 Blind Trust (TV Movie) as Attorney L.G. Mennick
 2009 Offspring as George Chandler
 2011 Monster Brawl as Sid "Sasquatch Sid" Tucker
 2011 Moon Point as The Banana
 2011 An Insignificant Harvey as Father Asher
 2012 Two Hands to Mouth as Ron Baxter
 2012 The Story of Luke as Mr. Nichols
 2013 Real Gangsters as Mitchel McClane
 2014 Big News from Grand Rock as Walter
 2014 The Big Fat Stone as Philly Versi
 2015 No Deposit as Joseph Ryan
 2015 Sicilian Vampire as Detective Domenic Supray
 2015 Full Out as Doctor
 2016 The Void as Mitchell
 2016 Sadie's Last Days on Earth as Mr. Scott
 2017 Adam's Testament as Father Callaghan
 2017 The Neighborhood as Artie
 2017 The Performance as Dennis
 2017 Happenstance as Robert
 2018 The Joke Thief as Brian McCabe
 2018 Robbery as Frank
 2019 Astronaut as Joe
 2021 Woodland Grey as Moses
 2022 - Nightalk as Captain Roberto

Television
 1975 Starsky & Hutch as John Colby (Episode: The Deadly Imposter)
 1977 Barnaby Jones as Joseph  (Episode: The Devil's Handmaiden)
 1977 James at 15 as Jud Lawrence
 1977 Kingston: Confidential as Tony Marino
 1978 The Clone Master as Dr. Simon Shane
 1981-1982 Dallas as Jeff Farraday
 1985 Scarecrow and Mrs. King as Larry Crawford
 1985 Airwolf as Karl Stern
 1985 MacGyver as Dave Redding 
 1987 Hunter as Harry
 1986-1987 Murder, She Wrote as Rod Wilson / Sam McKittrick
 1988 21 Jump Street as Stafford
 1988 Night Heat as Borden
 1988 Street Legal as Karl Morgan
 1989 Friday the 13th: The Series as McCabe (Episode: The Sweetest Sting)
 1989 L.A. Law as Walter Goetz
 1988-1989 Alfred Hitchcock Presents as Jack Gold / Alton Brooks
 1989-1994 E.N.G. as Mike Fennell
 1994 Matlock as Philip Chaney
 1995 Kung Fu: The Legend Continues as Martin Bradshaw
1995 Walker, Texas Ranger:El Coyote, part 1&2
 1997 The Arrow as Colonel Fairchild
 1996-1997 Beverly Hills, 90210 as Detective Bill Rendell
 1996-1997 North of 60 as Harry Dobbs
 1998 Due South as Robert Bedford
 1998 JAG as Captain Ward
 1999 Millennium as John Saxum
 1999 Total Recall 2070 as Frank Trower
 2002-2003 Tom Stone as Neil McQuinn
 2005 Canadian Case Files as Host
 2001-2008 Paradise Falls as Pete Braga
 2009 Too Late to Say Goodbye as Max Barber
 2018 The Good Witch as Arthur Pershing
 2018 Imposters as Mr. Hull Sr.
 2019 Le gala de Noël
 2019 Christmas in Montana as Pops Carson

Voice acting
Dot. - Mister Sherman

References

External links

Canadian male film actors
Film directors from Nova Scotia
Film directors from Toronto
Canadian male voice actors
Canadian male television actors
Living people
Male actors from Halifax, Nova Scotia
Male actors from Toronto
Best Actor in a Drama Series Canadian Screen Award winners
Year of birth missing (living people)